Gerald Melzer was the defending champion but lost in the final to Juan Pablo Ficovich.

Ficovich won the title after defeating Melzer 6–1, 6–2 in the final.

Seeds

Draw

Finals

Top half

Bottom half

References

External links
Main draw
Qualifying draw

Open Bogotá - 1
2022 Singles